Franz Albert Schultz (25 September 1692 – 19 May 1763) was a Prussian divine and superintendent.

Biography
Schultz was born 25 September 1692 in Neustettin (Szczecinek). He studied at the University of Halle-Wittenberg philosophy under Christian Wolff and divinity. At this time he followed August Hermann Francke's pietism. In 1723, having declined becoming a professor, he became educator at the Berlin Cadet Corps and in 1724 field preacher in Mohrungen. In 1728 he became Archpriest and Superintendent in Rastenburg, 1731 professor of divinity at the University of Königsberg. Immanuel Kant was among his students.

As Superintendent, Schultz instituted the first Prussian teacher seminaries, founded more than 600 schools, and paved the way to compulsory education. Under Frederick II, who was skeptical of pietism, his influence sank. He died 19 May 1763 in Königsberg.

See also
 Martin Knutzen

Notes

References
 Benno Erdmann, Martin Knutzen und seine Zeit.  Leipzig: Voss, 1876, pp. 22ff.

1692 births
1763 deaths
People from Szczecinek
People from Pomerania
Academic staff of the University of Königsberg